Marginea is a commune located in Suceava County, Bukovina, northeastern Romania. It is composed of a single village, more specifically Marginea.

Marginea is a centre for the production of handcrafted ceramics, characterized by their black colour.

Administration and local politics

Communal council 

The commune's current local council has the following political composition, according to the results of the 2020 Romanian local elections:

Natives 

 Orest Onofrei

References 

Communes in Suceava County
Localities in Southern Bukovina